List of Ministers of Finance of the Republic of Cyprus since independence in 1960:

Source:  Official list on the Web site of the Ministry

Finance